The European Party for Individual Liberty (EPIL) is a right-libertarian European political party established in Utrecht in September 2013 by The Utrecht Declaration and Covenant of European Classical Liberal and Libertarian Parties.

The Utrecht Declaration 
Multiple political parties active in Europe have agreed on various topics which include;
 Define themselves as classic liberal, libertarian or both, and consider themselves as part of the world movement for individual Liberty.
 Express their support for the political views derived from classical liberalism and its further radical and libertarian evolution, as well as their appreciation for philosophical rationalism and objectivity, and the Austrian School of Economics.
 To affirm the supremacy of individual freedom limited only by that of another person and inclusive of the full right to property, and their belief in a society based on the spontaneous order emerging from the cooperation of free citizens and their voluntary groups, under the rule of their freely entered agreements and contracts.

Member parties

References

European Parliament party groups
Pan-European political parties
Libertarian parties